Pegfilgrastim, sold under the brand name Neulasta among others, is a PEGylated form of the recombinant human granulocyte colony-stimulating factor (GCSF) analog filgrastim. It serves to stimulate the production of white blood cells (neutrophils). Pegfilgrastim was developed by Amgen.

Pegfilgrastim treatment can be used to stimulate bone marrow to produce more neutrophils to fight infection in patients undergoing chemotherapy.

Pegfilgrastim has a human half-life of 15 to 80 hours, much longer than the parent filgrastim (3–4 hours).

Pegfilgrastim was approved for medical use in the United States in January 2002, in the European Union in August 2002, and in Australia in September 2002.

Medical uses 
Pegfilgrastim is indicated to decrease the incidence of infection, as manifested by febrile neutropenia, in people with non-myeloid malignancies receiving myelosuppressive anti-cancer drugs associated with a clinically significant incidence of febrile neutropenia; and to increase survival in people acutely exposed to myelosuppressive doses of radiation (hematopoietic subsyndrome of acute radiation syndrome).

Biosimilars

Ristempa was approved for medical use in Australia in January 2017.

Tezmota was approved for medical use in Australia in March 2018.

Pegfilgrastim-jmdb (Fulphila) was approved for medical use in the United States in June 2018.

Fulphila was approved for medical use in Australia in August 2018.

Pelgraz was approved for medical use in the European Union in September 2018.

Udenyca was approved for medical use in the European Union in September 2018.

On 2 November 2018, Coherus Biosciences received FDA approval for its biosimilar, pegfilgrastim-cbqv (Udenyca). The push to receive approval and begin production of Udenyca was due in large part to the quickly increasing cost of Neulasta, which has nearly tripled since its release in 2002.

Pelmeg was approved for medical use in the European Union in November 2018.

Fulphila was approved for medical use in the European Union in November 2018.

Ziextenzo was approved for medical use in the European Union in November 2018.

Fulphila was approved for medical use in Canada in December 2018.

Grasustek was approved for medical use in the European Union in June 2019.

Ziextenzo was approved for medical use in Australia in July 2019.

Pelgraz was approved for medical use in Australia in August 2019.

Lapelga and Neutropeg were approved for medical use in Australia in August 2019.

Pegfilgrastim-bmez (Ziextenzo) was approved for medical use in the United States in November 2019.

Cegfila was approved for medical use in the European Union in December 2019.

Ziextenzo was approved for medical use in Canada in April 2020.

Pegfilgrastim-apgf (Nyvepria) was approved for medical use in the United States in June 2020. Nyvepria was approved for medical use in the European Union in November 2020.

Nyvepria was approved for medical use in Canada in October 2020.

Stimufend was approved for medical use in the European Union in March 2022.

Pegfilgrastim-pbbk (Fylnetra) was approved for medical use in the United States in May 2022.

Pegfilgrastim-fpgk (Stimufend) was approved for medical use in the United States in September 2022.

References

External links 
 
 

Immunostimulants
Recombinant proteins
Amgen
Hoffmann-La Roche brands